Prabhavathi is a 1944 Indian Tamil-language Hindu mythological film directed by T. R. Raghunath and produced by Lena Chettiar. The film stars Honnappa Bhagavathar and S. P. L. Dhanalakshmi. It was released on 6 August 1944, and was not commercially successful.

Plot 

The film revolves around the Hindu god Krishnan, his son Pradyumnan, the sage Naradar and his mischief-making activities, Pradyumnan being cursed by a sage into becoming a woman, how he is relieved of the curse due to Krishnan's involvement, and how Pradyumnan and his love interest Mayavathi are reunited.

Cast 

Male cast
 C. Honnappa Bhagavathar as Pradyumnan
 M. S. Saroja as Sri Krishnan
 N. S. Krishnan as Haridas
 K. Mahadevan Iyer as Naradar
 R. Balasubramaniam as Durvasar
 D. Balasubramaniam as Vajranabhan
 M. Lakshmanan as Indran
 T. R. Ramachandran as Bhadaranadan
 T. V. Namasivayam as Vishvamitrar
 V. Krishnan as Lakshmanan
 S. V. Sahasranamam as Shivan
 S. R. Swami as Brahma
 E. R. Sahadevan as Sunabhan
 Velayum as Kumbhanabhan
 Kolathu Mani as Pujari
 Pulimootai Ramaswami Iyer as Asurar
 Thiruvenkitam as Asurar
 Kuppusami as Asurar
 Shankaramoorthi as Asurar
 Chellamuthu as Asurar
 Krishnamoorthi as Asurar
 Chinnasami as Asurar
 Gopal as Asurar

Female cast
 S. P. L. Dhanalakshmi as Prabhavathi
 T. R. Rajakumari as Mayavathi
 T. A. Mathuram as Chitralekha
 T. S. Krishna Veni as Rukmani
 P. A. Periyanayaki as Kurathi
 P. A. Rajamani as Satyabhama
 A. R. Sakunthala as Ahalikai
 K. R. Chellam as Shakthi
 R. Padma as Rajahamsi
 Rathnam as Indrani
 T. A. Jayalakshmi as Dancer
 K. R. Jayalakshmi as Dancer
 K. S. Adilakshmi as Dancer
 K. S. Rajam as Dancer
 S. Saraswathi as Dancer
 V. S. Chitti Ammal as Dancer
 R. N. Dhanabhagyam as Dancer
Supporting cast
 T. D. Krishna Bai
 T. D. Kamala Bai
 P. S. Chandra
 V. Lakshmikantham

Production 
Prabhavathi was directed by T. R. Raghunath and produced by Lena Chettiar, under the production banner Krishna Pictures. Krishna, a male character, was played by Raghunath's wife M. S. Saroja.

Soundtrack

Release and reception 
Prabhavathi was released on 6 August 1944, and was distributed by Murugan Talkies. The film was not a commercial success, but film historian Randor Guy said it would be "Remembered for being one of the early movies of the glamour girl Rajakumari".

References

External links 

1940s Tamil-language films
1944 films
Films directed by T. R. Raghunath
Hindu mythological films
Indian black-and-white films